Fox Entertainment is an American production company owned by Fox Corporation. The company was formed in 2019 after The Walt Disney Company's acquisition of 21st Century Fox. The programming is created for the Fox Broadcasting Company, MyNetworkTV, and Tubi; Fox First Run serves as the syndication arm of the former, as well as a television distribution company for Fox Television Stations.

History
Fox Entertainment was formed in 2019 after Fox's former television studio, 20th Century Fox Television (among other assets), were acquired by Disney.

On August 6, 2019, Fox Entertainment acquired animation studio Bento Box Entertainment.

In April 2020, Fox Entertainment announced their partnership with Caffeine to bring the AniDom Beyond Show, a recap show hosted by Andy Richter.

Fox Entertainment planned to develop scripted and unscripted projects through a unit known as Sidecar, identifying and incubating programming for both Fox's broadcast network and third-party platforms. In June 2020, Fox shut down Sidecar, with reports citing the impact of the COVID-19 pandemic on the industry as being a factor.

In August 2021, Gordon Ramsay signed an overall deal with Fox Entertainment to form Studio Ramsay Global, which acquired all of Ramsay's existing Studio Ramsay business with All3Media, and will produce his future projects.

In September 2021, Fox Entertainment acquired TMZ from WarnerMedia in a deal worth about $50 million.

In November 2021, Fox Alternative Entertainment signed Wonwoo Park, creator of the South Korean format King of Mask Singer (which had been adapted by Fox as The Masked Singer) to a first-look deal with the studio.

In December 2021, Fox Entertainment acquired television film studio MarVista Entertainment, with a focus on producing content for its streaming service Tubi.

In February 2022, Fox Entertainment acquired the rights to the Gumby franchise.

In September 2022, Fox Corporation announced the launch of Fox Entertainment Studios. This is the company's first venture into entirely in-house television production. The studio debuted its first show, Monarch, on September 11, 2022. Fox also announced that Fox Entertainment would re-enter the international distribution business by launching a sales unit called Fox Entertainment Global. In January 2023, Fox Entertainment and Hulu announced that they have signed a new multi-year deal, encompassing in-season streaming rights for Fox's primetime shows.

Filmography

Television

Film

Divisions

Fox Alternative Entertainment

Fox Alternative Entertainment is Fox Entertainment's in-house unscripted studio.

Fox First Run

Fox First Run is the television syndication arm owned by Fox Corporation. it serves as the syndication arm of Fox Entertainment, the Fox Broadcasting Company, and MyNetworkTV. it was founded in 2019. It is also a television syndication/distribution company of Fox Television Stations.

XOF Productions

XOF Productions's name is derived from a reversal of "Fox".

Studio Ramsay Global

Studio Ramsay Global is a division of Fox Entertainment led by British chef Gordon Ramsay. Formed as part of an overall deal with Ramsay, the studio is focused on food and lifestyle-related programming. The studio was formed after Fox Entertainment acquired the existing Studio Ramsay from All3Media.

{| class="wikitable sortable"
|-
! Title
! Years
! Notes
! Network
|-
| Next Level Chef || rowspan="2" | 2022–present || co-production with Fox Alternative Entertainment
| Fox
|-
| Gordon Ramsay's Future Food Stars || co-production with Objective Media Group| BBC One
|-
| Trailblazers: A Rocky Mountain Roadtrip || 2022 ||
| BBC Two
|-
| Kitchen Commando || 2023–present || co-production with Fox Alternative Entertainment
| Tubi
|-
| Gordon Ramsay's Food Stars || 2023 || co-production with Fox Alternative Entertainment
| Fox
|}

Fox Entertainment Studios
Fox Entertainment Studios is a division of Fox Entertainment, launched in 2022, with Monarch'' being its first production.

References

Fox Corporation subsidiaries
2019 establishments in California
Companies based in Los Angeles
Entertainment companies based in California
Entertainment companies established in 2019
Mass media companies established in 2019
Television production companies of the United States
American companies established in 2019